Japanese School of Beijing (JSB) is a Japanese education day school in Chaoyang District, Beijing. The students are children of diplomats, businesspeople, and workers in foreign institutions. The school currently has approximately 640 students. It is only open to Japanese students.

History

The school was founded in 1974, making it one of the oldest international schools in Beijing. 

In 2005, eight North Koreans entered the school property in an attempt to get asylum.

See also

 Japanese people in China
Mainland China-aligned Chinese international schools in Japan:
 Kobe Chinese School
 Yokohama Yamate Chinese School

References

Further reading

 Gokami, Tetsuo (後上 鐵夫 Gokami Tetsuo; 国立特殊教育総合研究所教育相談部) and Michiyo Kobayashi (小林 倫代 Kobayashi Michiyo; 国立特殊教育総合研究所教育相談部). "上海日本人学校,北京日本人学校における特別支援教育の実情と教育相談支援" (Archive). 世界の特殊教育 21, 47-50, 2007-03. National Institute of Special Needs Education (独立行政法人国立特別支援教育総合研究所). See profile at CiNii.
 Kawachi, Masahiko (河内 正比古 Kawachi Masahiko; 北京日本人学校:(現)大阪府箕輪市立豊川北小学校). "北京日本人学校におけるインターネットの利用 : 海外日本人学校の今後のインターネット利用" (Archive). 年会論文集 (13), 242-243, 1997-08-08. Japan Society of Educational Information (日本教育情報学会). See profile at CiNii.
 Shimizu, Shigeo (清水 茂夫 Shimizu Shigeo; 前北京日本人学校教諭・群馬県吉岡町立明治小学校教諭) "北京日本人学校での教頭の職務." 在外教育施設における指導実践記録 24, 129-133, 2001. Tokyo Gakugei University. See profile at CiNii.
 Tamitsuji, Yoshikuni (民辻 義國 Tamitsuji Yoshikuni; 前北京日本人学校校長・埼玉県新座市立片山小学校校長). "北京日本人学校の活性化を目指した学校経営 : 海外ならではの特性を生かして." 在外教育施設における指導実践記録 23, 137-140, 2000. Tokyo Gakugei University. See profile at CiNii.
 小山 和智. "様変わりする日本人学校 北京日本人学校の場合--増え続ける生徒数と保護者の若年齢化がもたらす問題点." 教育ジャーナル 41(12), 26-28, 2003-02. 学習研究社. See profile at CiNii.
 "衝撃スクープ! 北京日本人学校に駆け込んだ脱北者4人と密着48時間 日本人NGOが覚悟の独占告白--あの時、失敗したら彼らは処刑されていた--難民を受け入れたくない日本政府の「弱腰」." サンデ-毎日 82(9), 24-28, 2003-03-09. Mainichi Shimbun Company (毎日新聞社). See profile at CiNii.
 李 英和. "脱北者 北京日本人学校駆け込み事件「運命の10分間」の全舞台裏 (SIMULATION REPORT 平和ボケ日本を襲う「盧武鉉・金正日」同盟という名の悪夢 「金正日の核戦争」対策読本 マニュアル)." サピオ 15(6), 22-24, 2003-03-26. 小学館. See profile at CiNii.
 遠藤 弘太郎. "北京日本人学校での三年間(第7章その他)." 在外教育施設における指導実践記録 28, 156-159, 2005. Tokyo Gakugei University. See profile at CiNii.
 山崎 豊子. "胡耀邦さんと北京日本人学校." 文芸春秋 75(10), 264-275, 1997-08. See profile at CiNii.

External links

 Japanese School of Beijing 

International schools in Beijing
Beijing
Schools in Chaoyang District, Beijing